The European Garden Heritage Network is a nonprofit organization established in 2003 within the EU-Programme INTERREG IIIB NWE to foster transnational co-operation in regional development and cultural heritage. It brings together garden experts, government services, foundations, and tourism agencies to preserve, develop, and promote gardens of historic interest within northwestern Europe.

Gardens

References 
 European Garden Heritage Network

Horticultural organizations
International cultural organizations
Lists of gardens